Vanessa Audi Rhys O'Brien (born 2 December 1964) is a British and American mountaineer, sub-orbital spaceflight participant, explorer, author and former business executive. On 4 August 2022, O'Brien became the first woman to complete the Explorers’ Extreme Trifecta – reaching extremes on land, sea, and air after she passed the Kármán line as part of Blue Origin NS-22 spaceflight. On 12 June 2020, O'Brien became the first woman to reach Earth's highest and lowest points, receiving a Guinness World Record. She became the first American woman to climb K2 and the first British woman to climb K2 and return safely (as a result of her dual nationality) on 28 July 2017, successfully leading a team of 12 members to the summit and back on her third attempt. She is a Fellow of the Royal Geographical Society (RGS) and an Honorary Advisory Member of The Scientific Exploration Society (SES).

O'Brien received a Fearless Girl Award in 2019 and was awarded Explorer of The Year in 2018 by SES. She set a Guinness World Record for climbing the highest peak on every continent in 295 days, the fastest time by a woman. O'Brien has also skied the last 60 nautical miles or 111 km to the South Pole and North Pole completing the Explorers Grand Slam in 11 months, becoming the first woman to do so in under a calendar year and the 8th woman in the world to accomplish this.

Early life 
Vanessa Audi Rhys O'Brien was born on 2 December 1964 and grew up in Grosse Pointe Farms, Michigan.

Education 
O'Brien attended New York University School of Professional Studies (SPS) where she received her Bachelor of Arts in Economics and Executive MBA in Finance from New York University Stern School of Business. Vanessa O'Brien was named one of the Top 10 most famous NYU Stern MBA's in 2021.

Career 
O'Brien worked as a Director of Finance and Business Development for Morgan Stanley, Barclays Bank, and the Bank of America.

Ambassador, board and research roles 

O'Brien is an Honorary Advisory Board member of the Scientific Exploration Society. She is also a Community Ambassador for the outdoor equipment company, Arc'Teryx, Soho, New York, and a Goodwill Ambassador for Pakistan, an Honorary Ambassador of the US Nepal Climbers Association Inc., and is an active member of The American Alpine Club. O'Brien previously held board positions at The Explorers Club, the American Pakistan Foundation, and was a former advisory board member for Thomson Safaris. O'Brien has contributed to a number of research and scientific projects including investigating the effects of nocturnal hypoxic exposure on high-altitude mountaineering (Explorers Club Flag No. 206 to Manaslu's summit at 26,759 feet), testing the thinning of high altitude glaciers (Explorers Club Flag #132 to the Godwin-Austen Glacier at 16,500 feet), and illustrating the impact of climate change at the equator in advance of COP21 in conjunction with Project 25Zero.

Vanessa is a global ambassador for iMedisync, a digital mental health care platform company, that provides early detection and treatment of MCI (mild cognitive impairment), dementia, Parkinson's and Alzheimer's Disease. O'Brien's use of MRI imaging pre and post spaceflights showed less activity in the Parietal Lobe indicating a loss of self, and a more connected or "at-one-with-the-world" state of mind.

Summits and poles 
Having trekked to Mount Everest base camp and reached the summits of a number of notable mountains, including five of the world's fourteen 8,000-meter peaks (Shishapangma, Everest, Cho Oyu, Manaslu, and K2), including summiting two eight thousanders back-to-back just 8 days apart (Shishapangma and Cho Oyu), O'Brien decided to build on her passion for mountaineering and set herself the challenge of achieving the Explorers Grand Slam. The Explorers Grand Slam entails reaching the Seven Summits, the North and South Poles, as well as meeting the Three Pole Challenge.

Challenger Deep 
O'Brien joined Caladan Oceanic's Ring of Fire expedition to the Pacific Ocean to survey the bottom of the three pools that constitute Challenger Deep in partnership with NOAA.

Suborbital Spaceflight 
O'Brien flew aboard Blue Origin NS-22, receiving FAA human spaceflight recognition, on 4 August 2022. For the sixth time in its 20-year history, Blue Origin successfully launched humans on a sub-orbital spaceflight on the New Shepard 22 mission. The five humans that flew with O'Brien included Coby Cotton, Mário Ferreira, Clint Kelly III, Sara Sabry, and Steve Young, flying to a height of 107 km above Mean Sea Level (351,232 ft MSL). The crew endured 3,603 km/h (2,239 mph) during ascent and flew for a total of 10 minutes and 20 seconds. This was the first spaceflight of Blue Origin involving two female crew members, and Vanessa O’Brien carried the UN Women's flag.

Other sports 
After taking the American Red Cross flag to the North Pole in 2013, O'Brien completed the Boston Marathon in 2017 to help the American Red Cross raise over $512,000 for charity.

O'Brien has the following photography credits at Forbes magazine for Motorsports in 2018 covering The National Hot Rod Association (NHRA) Four-Wide Nationals at zMAX Dragway in Charlotte, NC: Don Schumacher, Leah Pritchett, Tony Schumacher, and Antron Brown. O'Brien also has the following photography credits at Forbes magazine for Motorsports in 2015 covering Pocono Raceway: Justin Wilson, Mario Andretti, Rick Mears, and Sage Karam. Additional photos include Scott Dixon, Chip Ganassi, Mike Hull, and Pippa Mann.

Mountaineering expeditions

See also
 List of people who descended to Challenger Deep

References

External links
 

 
Living people
1964 births
New York University Stern School of Business alumni
American mountain climbers
Summiters of the Seven Summits
Explorers of Antarctica
Explorers of the Arctic
Female polar explorers
Female climbers
American summiters of Mount Everest
British mountain climbers
American sportswomen
English mountain climbers
British summiters of Mount Everest
Fellows of the Royal Geographical Society
American explorers of the Pacific
British explorers of the Pacific
British explorers
English explorers
English non-fiction writers
Aquanauts
21st-century American women
People who have flown in suborbital spaceflight
New Shepard passengers
New Shepard astronauts
Women astronauts